Alevtina Tanygina (born 15 December 1989) is a Russian cross-country skier. She competed in the World Cup 2015 season.

She represented Russia at the FIS Nordic World Ski Championships 2015 in Falun.

Cross-country skiing results
All results are sourced from the International Ski Federation (FIS).

World Championships

World Cup

Season standings

References

External links 
 

1989 births
Living people
Russian female cross-country skiers
Tour de Ski skiers
Place of birth missing (living people)